Crocus autranii  is a species of flowering plant in the genus Crocus of the family Iridaceae. It is a cormous perennial native to the western Transcaucasus (Abkhaziya).

References

autranii